The Europe Declaration, also known as the Charter of the Community, was a joint statement issued by the Foreign Ministers of West Germany, France, Italy, the Netherlands, Belgium, and Luxembourg in 1951. The Declaration was issued at the signing of the Treaty of Paris, which created the European Coal and Steel Community (ECSC) based on the Schuman Plan, on 18 April 1951.

The Declaration said that the ECSC marked the birth of the Europe as a political, economic and social entity, reflecting the principles that Robert Schuman had announced in the Schuman Declaration of 1950. It included the statement:

"By the signature of this Treaty, the involved parties give proof of their determination to create the first supranational institution and that thus they are laying the true foundation of an organised Europe. This Europe remains open to all European countries that have freedom of choice. We profoundly hope that other countries will join us in our common endeavour."

The declaration was signed by Konrad Adenauer (West Germany), Paul van Zeeland, Joseph Meurice (Belgium), Robert Schuman (France), Count Carlo Sforza (Italy), Joseph Bech (Luxembourg), Dirk Stikker and Jan van den Brink (Netherlands). It was made to recall future generations to their historic duty of uniting Europe based on liberty and democracy under the rule of law. Thus they viewed the creation of a wider and deeper Europe as intimately bound to the healthy development of the supranational or Community system.

References

External links
 Description of the declaration on European NAvigator

Declarations of the European Union
1951 in Europe
1951 documents